Eugnosta magnificana is a species of moth of the  family Tortricidae. It is found from Spain and southern France to North Macedonia, north to Hungary and east to the southern Ural Mountains, Asia Minor, Armenia, the Transcaspian area, Iran (Kandovan), Afghanistan and China (Inner Mongolia).

The wingspan is 19–29 mm. Adults are on wing from June to August.

Subspecies
Eugnosta magnificana magnificana
Eugnosta magnificana iberica Obraztsov, 1964 (Spain)

References

Moths described in 1914
Eugnosta